Guster on Ice - Live from Portland, Maine is a live album that was released by the band Guster in May 2004. It was recorded in December 2003 over two nights of concerts at the State Theatre in Portland, Maine. The DVD was directed by Danny Clinch.

Track listing

Disc one (CD)
"Careful"
"Happier"
"Red Oyster Cult"
"Ramona"
"Barrel of a Gun"
"(Nothing But) Flowers" (Talking Heads)
"Come Downstairs and Say Hello"
"Demons"
"Amsterdam"
"I Spy"
"Airport Song"
"Homecoming King"
"Fa Fa"

Disc two (DVD)
"Careful"
"Fa Fa"
"I Spy"
"(Nothing But) Flowers" (Talking Heads)
"Ramona"
"Red Oyster Cult"
"So Long"
"Airport Song"
"Backyard"
"Happier"
"Barrel of a Gun"
"Come Downstairs and Say Hello"
"Homecoming King"
"Mona Lisa"
"What You Wish For"
"Amsterdam"
"Demons"
"Careful"
"Jesus on the Radio"

References

Guster albums
2004 live albums
2004 video albums
Live video albums